Thouars Foot 79 is a French football club, based in Thouars. As of the 2019–20 season, it plays in the French sixth tier.

Honours 
 Champion de France Division 4: 1991
 Champion DH Centre-Ouest: 1984

Coaches 
 1985–1997: Bertrand Marchand
 1995–1998: Thierry Goudet
 2001: Jacky Lemée
 2003–????: Jean-Philippe Faure
 Corentin Maurice

References 

Sport in Deux-Sèvres
Association football clubs established in 1929
1929 establishments in France
Football clubs in Nouvelle-Aquitaine